Peter Sainthill may refer to:

 Peter Sainthill (died 1571) (1524–1571),  Member Parliament for Grampound, and for Saltash
 Peter Sainthill (MP for Tiverton) (1593–1648), Member of Parliament for Tiverton in Devon
 Peter Sainthill (surgeon) (1698–1775), British 18th century surgeon and Fellow of the Royal Society